Basic training or Basic Training may refer to:

Basic training for any set of skills, occupation, trade, or profession
 Recruit training, in military
United States Army Basic Training
 Compulsory Basic Training, a preliminary vehicular training course in the United Kingdom
 Basic Training, a 1971 American documentary directed by Frederick Wiseman
 Basic Training (1985 film), an American sex comedy
Basic Training: Boot Camp Clik's Greatest Hits an album by American hip hop collective Boot Camp Clik

See also
The Basic Training of Pavlo Hummel, play by David Rabe